Rav Sar Shalom ben Boaz (Hebrew: רב שר שלום בן בועז; d. 859 or 864) also known as Sar Shalom Gaon was the Gaon of Sura from 838 to 848. He was one of the most prolific writers of his time, having more than one hundred responsa attributed to him. He is known for his unusually lenient and tolerant attitude towards Halakha which defined his tenure as Gaon, as well as left an impact on the complexion of Babylonian Jewry.

Biography 
Rav Sar Shalom was elected to the Gaonate in 838, succeeding Kohen Tzedek ben Abimai. In 853, he was succeeded as Gaon of Sura by Natronai ben Hilai. He shortly died thereafter, passing away in either 859 or 864 in Sura.

Teachings
During his time as Gaon, Rav Sar Shalom established a close and extensive relationships with other Jewish communities, such as those in Rome, Spain and especially Kairouan to which many of his responsa where addressed. In many of said responsa, he warned the people not to establish halakhic institutions which they would not be able to observe, and if he heard that a community had restricted itself by a vow which it later felt unable to comply with, he would use the authority of his office to rescind it.

In almost all of his responsa to neighbouring communities, Rav Sar Shalom writes in a friendly and non condescending tone despite his esteemed position. In halakhic cases, he often points out the differences between Sura and Pumbedita, letting each community choose which academy's view suits them best. Furthermore, he would go on to explain in great detail his halakhic reasoning, so that each community could learn the processes of paskening (halakic decision making).

His responsa also clearly show that Rav Sar Shalom was very tolerant toward non-Jews; he explicitly prohibited taking advantage of, or in any way infringing upon the rights of, gentiles, even when there was no Chillul Hashem. Despite his mild and tolerant disposition, he was adamantly against money lenders, and encouraged the severe punishment of those men who treat their wives poorly or those women who are rebellious toward their husbands.

He often interpreted the Bible symbolically. In one particular case, he explained that the thirty cubits length of the upper curtains of the Temple represented the thirty generations from Isaac to King Zedekiah, who witnessed the destruction of Solomon's Temple. Similarly, he also states that the Temple menorah consisting of twenty-five parts symbolizes the twenty-five generations from Adam to Moses.

References 

Rabbis of Academy of Sura
Geonim
800s deaths
9th-century rabbis